Apple Inc.'s MFi Program, referring to "Made for iPhone/iPod/iPad", is a licensing program for developers of hardware and software peripherals that work with Apple's iPod, iPad and iPhone. The name is a shortened version of the long-form Made for iPod, the original program that ultimately became MFi.

The MFi program covers various device connectors including the headphone jack, original dock connector and the newer Lightning connector, as well as AirPlay support. Companies joining the MFi program and passing certification tests are able to display certain MFi-related logos on their product packaging, like the "Made for iPod" badge.

Made for iPod
The Made for iPod program was launched at the Macworld Expo on 11 January 2005, although some products released just before the announcement carried a "Ready for iPod" label instead. It was reported at that time that Apple would be charging a 10% cut for all products with the logo, and the press described this as a "tax". iPods use an extended headphone jack that allows additional control inputs like mute and volume adjustments, and licenses were available for products plugging into the jack or the dock connector.

When using the dock connector, devices are able to control the iPod using a simple serial protocol known as the Apple Accessory Protocol (AAP). This uses a (normally) 19,200 bit/s 8N1 communications signal to send short packets containing commands like "take voice note" or "volume up". With the introduction of the 3rd generation iPods, AAP was available to the headphone connection as well. These signals are used by many Made for iPod devices to allow remote control, including car integration systems.

New product lines

With the introduction of the iPhone the program name extended to "Made for iPod and Made for iPhone", and then still again with the iPad to become "Made for iPod, iPhone and iPad". The program name officially changed to MFi around 2010, although this term had been used unofficially for some time.

The MFi program now also covers the AirTunes system for wirelessly streaming music. AirTunes was originally introduced in 2004 on the Mac and PC platforms inside iTunes, and later became known as AirPlay when video-out capabilities were added to support devices like the Apple TV. AirPlay came to the devices when they gained WiFi capabilities with the introduction of the iPhone and iPod Touch. With no hardware component, AirPlay has been widely implemented in both official and non-MFi software systems (see AirPlay for details).

Lightning connector
With the introduction of the Lightning connector, the branding was changed and officially became MFi, a term that had been used unofficially for some time. Lightning also introduced additional protocols that could only be officially supported through the MFi program. In addition to the technical requirements, according to TUAW, Apple also took the opportunity to update the licensing agreement to require all 3rd parties to agree to Apple's supplier responsibility code.

iOS 7 and beyond
The release of the developer's version of iOS 7 at the 2013 WWDC included a new MFi approval for game controllers, either wrap-around designs that clip onto an iOS device, or completely separate wireless models.

Developers wishing to integrate their devices and application with HomeKit must also be members of the MFi program in order to get access to specifications, as well as certify their products.

References

External links
 

Apple Inc. peripherals